Mohnyin District is a district of the Kachin State in northern Burma (Myanmar). The administrative center is Mohnyin.

Townships
The district contains the following three townships:

Mongyaung Township 
Mohnyin Township 
Hpakant Township (Kamaing Township)

Districts of Myanmar
Kachin State